Theofilaktos Nikolaidis (born 21 July 1973) is a Greek footballer who plays for Prosotsani F.C. in Delta Ethniki.

Nikolaidis played for several teams in the Greek Super League, including most recently Skoda Xanthi F.C.

References

1973 births
Living people
Greek footballers
Panathinaikos F.C. players
Xanthi F.C. players
PAS Giannina F.C. players
Kastoria F.C. players
Kavala F.C. players
Panachaiki F.C. players
Association football midfielders
Footballers from Drama, Greece